Janusz Suchywilk of Grzymala Coat of Arms (c. 1310 – 5 April 1382) was a Polish nobleman (szlachcic), relative of Jarosław z Bogorii i Skotnik.

Janusz became Chancellor of the Polish Kingdom and Archbishop of Gniezno in 1374. From 1357 until 1373 he served as Chancellor of Kraków. He was an outstanding lawyer. He is considered as the co-author of King Casimir III of Poland's statutes. An advocate of Kazko IV Prince of Słupsk for the Polish throne after the death of King Kazimierz. He was the leader of the opposition to King Louis the Great.

External links
 Virtual tour Gniezno Cathedral

References

1310 births
1382 deaths
14th-century Polish nobility
Chancellors of Poland
Archbishops of Gniezno
14th-century Roman Catholic archbishops in Poland